Pudhu Nilavu is a 1996 Indian Tamil-language film, written, directed and produced by Visnhuhasan. The film stars Jayaram, Vineetha, Ramesh Aravind and Sanghavi.

Plot
Madan breaks his friendship with Anand because the latter likes the same girl he does. However, Madan is extremely shocked when he makes a discovery about Anand.

Cast

Jayaram as Anand
Vineetha
Ramesh Aravind as Madhan
Sanghavi
Goundamani
Senthil
Major Sundarrajan
Charle
Ilavarasi
Sailatha
Idichapuli Selvaraj
Kazan Khan
Jyothi Meena
Junior Balaiah
C. R. Saraswathi
Karuppu Subbiah
Chelladurai
Thiruppur Ramasamy
Anuja

Soundtrack
Soundtrack was composed by Deva. Lyrics written by Vairamuthu and Kalidasan.
"Aathooram Malligaiye" - Malaysia Vasudevan
"Manidhargalae Oru" - Malaysia Vasudevan
"Nalla Manam" - Malaysia Vasudevan
"Naughty Girl" - Swarnalatha
"Paravaigalae" - Malaysia Vasudevan
"Pudhu Nilavu Idhu" - S. Janaki
"Saela Onnu Katti" - Swarnalatha
"Thenpandi Thendral" - S. P. Balasubrahmanyam
"Vanna Vanna Pookal" - Unni Menon

References

1996 films
1990s Tamil-language films
Indian action films
Films scored by Deva (composer)
1996 action films